Kriyā (Sanskrit: क्रिया, 'action, deed, effort') is a "completed action", technique or practice within a yoga discipline meant to achieve a specific result.

Kriya or Kriya Yoga may also refer to:

 Kriya Yoga school, a modern yoga school
 Kriya, a class of Tantra in Tibetan Buddhism

See also
 Kriya Yoga Express, a train that runs between Howrah and Hatia in India
 Kriya (company) (Kriya Finance Limited), a British business finance lender